Haimeidae is a family of cnidarians belonging to the order Alcyonacea.

Genera:
 Haimea Bergroth, 1905
 Haimeia Milne-Edwards, 1857
 Hartea Wright, 1865
 Ignis Dautova, 2018

References

Cnidarian families
Alcyonacea